Charodinsky District is an administrative and municipal district (raion), one of the forty-one in the Republic of Dagestan, Russia. It is located in the south of the republic. Its administrative center is the rural locality (a selo) of Tsurib. As of the 2010 Census, the total population of the district was 11,777, with the population of Tsurib accounting for 19.0% of that number.

Administrative and municipal status
Within the framework of administrative divisions, Charodinsky District is one of the forty-one in the Republic of Dagestan. The district is divided into nine selsoviets which comprise fifty-three rural localities. As a municipal division, the district is incorporated as Charodinsky Municipal District. Its nine selsoviets are incorporated as thirteen rural settlements within the municipal district. The selo of Tsurib serves as the administrative center of both the administrative and municipal district.

Notable people
Freestyle Wrestling World and Olympic Champion Abdulrashid Sadulaev is from Charodinsky District.

References

Notes

Sources



Districts of Dagestan